is a feminine Japanese given name. The name Chika can be written with the kanji characters 千 (chi) meaning "thousand", 智 (chi) meaning "wisdom, intellect" or 散 (chi) meaning "scatter" combined with 佳 (ka) meaning "good, fine" or 花 (ka) meaning "flower". Chika can also be written with many different kanji characters thus, giving the name various meanings.

Possible writings in Japanese
Chika can be written using different kanji characters and can mean:
千佳, "thousand, excellence"
千夏, "thousand, summer"
千賀, "thousand, celebration"
千香, "thousand, fragrance"
千花, "thousand, flower"
千華, "thousand, chinese flower"
千果, "thousand, fruit"
知香, "knowledge, fragrance"
知佳, "knowledge, excellence"
智香, "wisdom, fragrance"
愛, "love" (nanori reading)

The name can also be written in hiragana or katakana.

People
 Chika, a member of the Japanese girl group D&D
 , Japanese voice actress
 , Japanese fencer
 , Japanese women's footballer
 , Japanese professional footballer
 Chika Kodama (born 1970), Japanese softball player
 , Japanese chemist
 , Japanese ice hockey player 
 , Japanese avant-garde poet
 , Japanese voice actress
 , Japanese manga artist
 , Japanese singer and songwriter
 , Japanese YouTuber known as Bilingirl 

Fictional characters
Chika Akatsuki (知佳), a character in the manga series Zombie-Loan.
Chika Amatori, a character in the manga and anime series World Trigger.
Chika Fujiwara (千花), a character in the manga and anime series Kaguya-sama: Love Is War.
Chika Ito (千佳), a character in the manga and anime series Strawberry Marshmallow.
Chika Midarezaki (千花), a character in the Japanese light novel series Kyōran Kazoku Nikki.
 Chika Minazuki (ちか), a character in the manga and anime series Ai Yori Aoshi.
 Chika Misumi (千歌), a character in the mobile gacha game Princess Connect Re:Dive.
 Chika Ogiue (千佳), a character in the manga and anime series Genshiken.
Chika Takami (千歌), a character in the Japanese multimedia project Love Live! Sunshine!!.
Chika Yurikasa (千佳), a character in the manga and anime series Shrine of the Morning Mist.
Chika Yamada (千夏), a character in the manga and anime series B Gata H Kei.
Chika Kudou (久遠愛), a character in the manga and anime series Kono Oto Tomare! Sounds of Life.
Chika, a chacter in the manga series Monkey High!.

See also

Chica (name)
Chika (general name)
Chika (Igbo given name)
Chika (disambiguation)
Chiki
Chicka (disambiguation)

References

Japanese feminine given names